The Chirchiq or Chirchik is a river of Uzbekistan, a major right tributary of the Syr Darya. The principal tributary is the Ugom (right).

The river is formed at the confluence of the rivers Chatkal and Pskem, which form the Lake Charvak reservoir. It flows through about 30 km of canyon in the upper reaches. Below, the valley widens and eventually joins the Syr Darya. There are several dams on the river which serve both for electricity generation and irrigation. All main canals of Tashkent, such as Bozsu, Anhor, Salar, and Burijar are fed by the water from Chirchik. The river flows through or in close proximity to the cities Xoʻjakent, Gʻazalkent, Chirchiq, Tashkent, Yangiyoʻl, and Chinoz.

A number of hydroelectric dams are built along the river.

References

Rivers of Uzbekistan
Tributaries of the Syr Darya